Guy Kennaway is an English writer specialising in memoir and comic novels. He is represented by Mark Stanton at the North Literary Agency. In 2021 he won the Bollinger Everyman Wodehouse Prize for his comic fiction The Accidental Collector.

Bibliography 
One People, 1999 (Canongate Books)
Sunbathing Naked, 2008 (Canongate Books)
Bird Brain, 2011 (Jonathan Cape)
Time To Go, 2019 (Mensch Publishing]
The Accidental Collector, 2021 (Mensch Publishing)
Foot Notes 2021 (Mensch Publishing)
One People, 2022 (Eland Books)

Publications 

 Why I Write Bookanista
 The Very Thing Keeping Tourist Safe In Jamaica? Crime. Spectator UK
 A Jamaican Life Eland Books

Awards

2021 - Bollinger Everyman Wodehouse Prize

References 

Year of birth missing (living people)
Living people
21st-century English novelists